Ranthambore may to refer :

 Ranthambore National Park, a national park in northern India 
 Ranthambore Fort, a fort within the Ranthambore National Park
 Ranthambore Express, superfast train service in Indore and Jodhpur
 Ranthambore railway station, a railway station in Sawai Madhopur district, Rajasthan

See also 
 Siege of Ranthambore (disambiguation)